For the 1988–89 West Ham United F.C. season in English football, West Ham United finished 19th in the league.

Season summary

The 1988–89 season saw new signings Allen McKnight and David Kelly both begin their West Ham United careers, but neither supplied the club with the kind of form necessary to stay in the top flight.

On 22 March 1989, it looked as though Lyall had come up with the goods to save West Ham's top flight status when he recaptured Frank McAvennie from Glasgow Celtic for a club record fee of £1.1 million – just after the player had turned down the chance to sign for Arsenal, who went on to win the league. However, McAvennie failed to repeat the goalscoring heroics of his first spell at Upton Park as he didn't score a single goal in nine league appearances and the Hammers were relegated despite winning five of their final seven games.

The club finished in 19th place in the First Division and were relegated to the second tier of the Football League.

John Lyall was sacked as manager after 15 years on 5 June 1989, by which time he was the longest serving manager at any League club. It also ended his 34-year service with the club, which had started in 1955 when he signed for them as an apprentice player from school.

League table

Results
West Ham United's score comes first

Football League First Division

FA Cup

League Cup

Squad

Transfers

Transfers in

Transfers out

See also
West Ham United F.C. by season

References

1989-90
West Ham United
1988 sports events in London
1989 sports events in London